Arattai Messenger or simply Arattai, is an Indian freeware, cross-platform instant messaging (IM), Voice over IP (VoIP) application, developed by Zoho Corporation. The app was launched in January 2021 following American messaging app WhatsApp's changes to its privacy policy.

References

External links 
 Arattai Website

Mobile applications
Android (operating system) software
IOS software
Communication software